The 1957 Georgia Tech Yellow Jackets football team represented the Georgia Institute of Technology during the 1957 NCAA University Division football season. The Yellow Jackets were led by 13th-year head coach Bobby Dodd and played their home games at Grant Field in Atlanta.

The team's statistical leaders included Fred Braselton with 486 passing yards and Lester Simerville with 275 rushing yards.

Schedule

Source:

References

Georgia Tech
Georgia Tech Yellow Jackets football seasons
Georgia Tech Yellow Jackets football